Ernest Eugene Sykes Sr. (January 3, 1867 – March 24, 1942) was a New Orleans, Louisiana, businessman and philanthropist. He was very active in Freemasonry, and became one of the leading and best-known Masons in the southern United States.

Early life

Sykes was born on January 3, 1867, to Albert Sykes (1817–1906) and Emily Higgins Sykes (1835–1904) on a farm in Bremer County, Iowa. His father's family was one of the oldest in New England and held a distinguished position there. In the 1670s, his family founded Suffield, Connecticut, where they remain well known today. His grandfather was Colonel Daniel Sykes, who served in the War of 1812, and his great-grandfather was Ashbel Sykes, who served as an officer in the Revolutionary War. Ernest's parents had moved west and when he was 5 years old, his family moved once more to a farm in Oswego, Kansas, due to the large influx of German immigrants into their part of Iowa. His father achieved great success there and became a leading citizen when Kansas was still really on the frontier. When he turned 17, Sykes enrolled at Baker University, the oldest college in the state, graduating in 1888. Future Republican Congressman Philip P. Campbell was in his graduating class and the two became very good friends. They often discussed politics and Campbell helped to greatly shape Sykes's political views.

Early career

After graduating college, he drifted between several jobs before gaining employment in Galveston, Texas, at the Gulf, Colorado, and Santa Fe Railway. He remained in this position until moving to New Orleans in 1900 and took a job as a bookkeeper for the E.B. Williams Lumber Company. He was a very dedicated worker and quickly rose up the company ranks.

In 1904, he used money he inherited from his mother to form the Southern Sawmill Corporation with E.B. Williams and several others, which became the largest distributor of cypress in the south. In 1908, he and Williams began purchasing large tracts of timberland and formed the Avoyelles Cypress Company. In 1909, they continued buying land at an even faster rate and formed the Ascension Red Cypress Company.

In addition to being a major stockholder and officer of these 3 companies, he also invested heavily in oil and banking, and was on the board of directors of the Victory Oil Company and the Fidelity Homestead Association, now the Fidelity Southern Corporation of Atlanta. In the early 1920s, Sykes, based on the knowledge he gained via his investment and involvement in the Victory Oil Company, became convinced that there was oil on a 10,000-acre tract of land owned by one of his companies, the Ascension Red Cypress Company. He asked its board of directors to allocate $100,000 for preliminary drilling on the property to try to find oil, but they fought and contested doing so for several years. Finally, in 1928, they gave him the money he wanted and shortly thereafter, the largest oil gusher in the history of Louisiana was discovered on the property. Sykes and his investors quickly formed the United Lands Company to operate the oil business, and he served as its president until his death in 1942.

Freemasonry

Freemasonry became the great cause of Sykes's life. In the first half of the 20th century, it was a very powerful organization with a huge number of members, amount of money and political influence. Sykes first joined Louisiana Lodge No. 102 F. & A. M., Grand Lodge of Louisiana in 1916, and in 1921, signed the charter to form Trinity Lodge, and became its Master. He became a member of every Masonic rank and order, and in 1928, was elected Illustrious Potentate of the Mason Temple in New Orleans, a very high office. He served as Louisiana's delegate to the Masonic Imperial Council for many years in the United States and abroad. In 1931, he was elected Grand Master of the Grand Lodge of Louisiana, the highest Masonic office in the state, and was sworn in by fellow Mason and Chief Justice of the Louisiana Supreme Court.

In 1927, Louisiana, Arkansas, and Mississippi were ravaged by the worst flood in American history, the Great Mississippi Flood of 1927. 27,000 square miles of land were flooded to depths as deep as 30 feet, and over 600,000 people were affected. A 1931 biography explains his involvement in the flood relief:

"In 1927 when the State of Louisiana was devastated by the greatest
flood in its history and homes were desolated, farms destroyed and the
people of Louisiana and the members of the Masonic Fraternity were
suffering from the greatest privations, a Masonic Flood Relief Board was
organized, composed of the Grand Masters of Arkansas, Louisiana and
Mississippi, in association with the Masonic Service Association of the
United States. In casting about for an executive secretary of intelligence, business ability and experience, who might be willing to turn
aside from his own personal business and affairs and devote his time and
energy to the collection of a relief fund, the name of Brother Sykes was
suggested and he was called before the Masonic Board of Flood Relief
and the proposition submitted to him. He was asked to say whether or
not he would undertake the work and to name the compensation he
would expect therefor. His response was the immediate acceptance of the
appointment, subject, however, to the stipulation that his service was to
be without fee or reward. How he handled the stupendous labor connected with the collection of more than $600,000.00 of flood relief funds
over a period of approximately four months; how he wrote and answered
thousands of letters to the contributors to that fund, is a matter of
Masonic history."

Further philanthropy

In 1920, he was a delegate for the state of Louisiana to the Masonic Imperial Session in Portland, Oregon, where it was resolved to establish Shriners Hospitals for Children. He was a major early benefactor and stayed very involved with the first hospital in Shreveport, Louisiana until his death. There are now 22 Shriners Hospitals. He was also a member of the board of directors of the Masonic Home For Children at Alexandria, Louisiana.

In 1922, Sykes, along with Charles F. Buck Jr., the son of wealthy congressman Charles F. Buck, bought the Old Prytania Market in New Orleans and spent $30,000 to turn it into a world class market with the highest sanitary conditions of the day. They then gifted it to the city and the people of New Orleans to provide them with a modern, safe, and sanitary place to purchase their food.

Personal life

In 1895 he married Mary Caroline "Carrie" O'Byrne (1868–1956). She was the daughter of Methodist minister Richard O'Byrne (1839–1919) and Hannah Stephens (1843–1873), the daughter of a well to do paper manufacturer. Carrie was the great-great granddaughter of Benjamin Weatherby, a captain in the American Revolution, who was a good family friend of General Anthony Wayne, the Revolutionary War hero. The Battle of Quinton's Bridge was named for the land and bridge that it took place on, which were named for Weatherby's wife, Edith Quinton Smith's, great-grandfather Tobias Quinton (1662–1705) who first settled the land and had the bridge erected. Together Ernest and Carrie Sykes had 2 children:

 Ernest Eugene Sykes Jr. (1896–1966) a career military officer who fought in both World War I and World War II and married Eileen Hill (1905–1974) from Liverpool, England in 1924. They had 3 children (2 of whom survived into adulthood) and moved to Mobile, Alabama, in the 1930s.
 Lois Hazel Sykes (1898–1980) who never married. She graduated from Sophie Newcomb College in 1919 and was well known on the New Orleans social scene. She was a frequent traveller to Europe and spent her life advancing her families charitable interests and causes.

Ernest Sykes died at age 75 on March 24, 1942, of a heart attack.

References 

1867 births
1942 deaths
American Freemasons
Baker University alumni
Businesspeople from New Orleans
Philanthropists from Louisiana